Urban China Initiative (UCI) is a new initiative with the aim to establish a think-tank with the express mission of finding and implementing effective solutions to China's urbanization challenge. It is a joint initiative led by Columbia University, the School of Public Policy and Management at Tsinghua University, and McKinsey & Company. UCI was launched in November 2010.

Mission 
To fulfill its mission, the UCI has three specific aims:

 Solutions – Be the source of the best and most innovative solutions to urban development issues in China.
 Talent – Be a home for China's leading domestic and international urban thinkers and professionals, and a magnet for the best global thinkers
 Dialogue – Be the convenor of China's leading national, provincial and local dialogues on urban issues

Partners and Organization 
The Founding Partners of the Initiative are McKinsey & Company, Columbia University's Global Center for East Asia, and the School of Public Policy and Management at Tsinghua University.

The Initiative also maintains strategic partnerships with the Chinese Society for Urban Studies and the Institute of Urban Environmental Studies under the Chinese Academy of Sciences.

Research

Urban Sustainability Index
The Urban Sustainability Index is the first tool of its kind designed specifically for Chinese cities. The Index is meant to help urban leaders make informed policy decisions by pinpointing cities that would benefit most from sustainable development initiatives, and to highlight effective case studies by locating and examining cities that have made great strides in recent years. UCI published the first USI in November 2010 and completed the first annual update in April, 2012.

Urban Financing
Lack of urban development funding has been one of the major bottlenecks for China's urbanization. This project explores financing models for local government that provide support for promoting urban development and meeting the various needs of the growing population. The research will review best international practice of urban financing by municipal governments as well as conduct several case studies. It will then comprehensively analyze problems existing in current urban financing mechanisms in China and financing needs of different local governments. Based on the analysis, the research will propose financing models and case studies especially for the development of the energy industry, infrastructure, affordable housing and industrial zones.

Smart City
The construction of smart cities could bring a new investment wave in urban infrastructure and change city management in many aspects. This project seeks an in-depth understanding of smart city construction practices in China, and to develop a smart city construction model fitting actual situation of China on the bases of related theories and international experiences. The research will review the basic concept and development history of smart city, and compare the experiences of the typical districts and cities in China (Beijing, Shanghai, Jiang’an (Wuhan), Zhenhai (Ningbo), Xixian (Xian), and so on) and developed countries.

Monitoring and Evaluation of Local Government
China is in a phase of rapid urbanization guided by the forthcoming National Plan of Promoting Healthy Development of Urbanization. This research will employ the Urban Indicator System jointly developed by the Urban China Initiative and the National Development and Reform Commission in 2012 to monitor the urbanization process at both national and local scale, evaluate developments in economy, society and environment and assess the implementation of urbanization policies. The research will also select high-performing cities to review their experience and identify possible suggestions for under-performing cities. The research is expected to propose the establishment of a nationwide database, to publish an annual monitoring report and to provide case studies of implementation of urbanization policies.

Urban Indicator System
The Urban China Initiative and the Department of Development Planning (DDP) at the National Development and Reform Commission (NDRC) are currently conducting joint research to build a comprehensive indicators system to assess the pace and quality of China's urbanization.
The Urban Indicators System will be informed by UCI's past work in the area of sustainability indicators. The system will inform the drafting of the NDRC's long-term urban policy plan, in particular three major challenges facing China as it urbanizes: integration of migrants into cities, optimization of urban layouts and structures, and ensuring sustainable development of China's growing cities.

Urban Citizenship of Chinese Migrants
The Urban China Initiative cooperates with National Development and Reform Commission, Sichuan Development and Reform Commission, and Guangdong Development and Reform Commission on Policy Research on Urban Citizenship of Chinese Migrants. China’s urbanization witnesses a massive influx of rural peasants toward cities. These so-called migrant workers – amounting to more than 200 million in China – provided cheap and productive labor for China's economic boom in urban areas. But they usually fall victim to China's divided rural-urban social policies and are largely denied government benefits that urban residents receive. The central and local governments have launched a series of pilot programs to help migrants better integrate into cities. The UCI research aims to take stock of these experiments and provide inputs to relevant policy makings.

Research on Mega Regions
The Urban China Initiative works with the National Development and Reform Commission and Guangdong Development and Reform Commission in combining through the cases of mega region planning in the world in order to find the best international practices. The joint research makes a comprehensive review on the forming and evolving of mega regions. It also sums up the major challenges and solutions of a series of classic mega region cases in the world to provide strategic thinking to Chinese policy making in the field of spatial planning, density and intra-cluster network development.

Grants
The Urban China Initiative's grant program promotes innovative research on urban development in China, leading to the publication of working papers and implementation through city pilots. Upon completion of supported research projects, UCI reviews successful grant-supported projects for implementation in pilot programs at the city level in cooperation with local authorities.

The Urban China Initiative accepts grant applications twice a year. To encourage researchers and practitioners pursuing the topic of sustainable urbanization, UCI accepts research applications on a bi-annual basis for grants up to RMB 100,000. Research for the grants is expected to be completed within a year. Successful applicants are required to produce a research paper to be published as part of the Initiative's research program.

 Types of Grants
Core Grants (up to RMB 100,000) are identified as Urban China Initiative projects and receive research assistance and analytical support from the Initiative in addition to grant funding.

Research Grants (up to RMB 50,000) may be used to carry out the grantee's research proposal, including hiring research assistants, obtaining course relief, and funding travel and per diems.

 Areas of Research
UCI supports research on the effectiveness of programs and technologies related to urban development; emerging domestic and global best practices in project design, development, and execution; and paths to successful structural adjustment in China's cities. Grant-supported research focuses on sustainable urbanization, including but not limited to public health, energy efficiency, consumer awareness, public finance, industrial policy, migrant labor, urban infrastructure, environmental issues, social development, housing and land, and education.

Events

Annual Forum
The UCI Annual Forum provides an inclusive forum for international and Chinese urban thinkers to discuss urban problems and trends, to trigger innovative ideas for solutions, and to create a network of policy makers, professionals and academics.

The UCI hosted its first annual forum in Beijing on October 22, 2011, providing a dialogue platform for over 300 participants. And the 2012 annual forum in Beijing on September 7, involves more than 400 urbanists from central and local government, academia, corporates, and nonprofits.

Urban Leaders Roundtable
The Urban Leaders Roundtable Series is UCI's quarterly flagship and invitation-only event. The event brings together 20 leaders in China, including ministers, government directors, corporate senior executives, NGO leaders, and top academic theorists. The roundtable series examines pressing urban issues in China.

Training
The UCI hosts and co-organizes trainings on urban issues. These trainings provide theoretical and practical knowledge for urbanists to think in a professional, systematic, and long-term way and make wiser decisions for the sustainable development of China's cities. Trainers are mainly scholars and professional experts in urban affairs. It is our hope that these training sessions will help Chinese cities learn from domestic and international best practices.

Workshops
Despite of Annual Forum and Urban Leaders Roundtable, a series of urbanization workshops are held to convene professionals involved in China's urban affairs to examine problems, solutions, and implications of specific urbanization challenges.

External links 
 Urban China Initiative Official Website

Research institutes in China